Synema is a genus of spider in the family Thomisidae, found in most parts of the world.

Species
, the World Spider Catalog accepted 125 species:

Synema abrahami Mello-Leitão, 1948 – Guyana
Synema adjunctum O. Pickard-Cambridge, 1891 – Panama
Synema aequinoctiale (Taczanowski, 1872) – Mexico, French Guiana
Synema affinitatum O. Pickard-Cambridge, 1891 – Mexico to Brazil
Synema albomaculatum Ono, 2001 – Bhutan
Synema anatolica Demir, Aktas & Topçu, 2009 – Turkey
Synema annulipes Dahl, 1907 – East Africa
Synema bariguiensis Mello-Leitão, 1947 – Brazil
Synema batarasa Barrion & Litsinger, 1995 – Philippines
Synema bellum Soares, 1944 – Brazil
Synema berlandi Lessert, 1919 – Ethiopia, East Africa
Synema bipunctatum (Taczanowski, 1872) – Brazil, French Guiana
Synema bishopi Caporiacco, 1955 – Venezuela, French Guiana
Synema bourgini Millot, 1942 – Guinea
Synema buettneri Dahl, 1907 – Cameroon, Togo
Synema camerunense Dahl, 1907 – Cameroon
Synema candicans (O. Pickard-Cambridge, 1876) – Egypt
Synema caucasicum Utochkin, 1960 – Georgia
Synema cervinum Schenkel, 1936 – China
Synema chikunii Ono, 1983 – Japan
Synema concolor Caporiacco, 1947 – East Africa
Synema conradti Dahl, 1907 – Cameroon
Synema curvatum Dahl, 1907 – East Africa
Synema decens (Karsch, 1878) – South Africa
Synema decoratum Tikader, 1960 – India, China
Synema diana (Audouin, 1826) – Tunisia to Saudi Arabia
Synema fasciatum Mello-Leitão, 1929 – Brazil
Synema fiebrigi Dahl, 1907 – Paraguay
Synema fischeri Dahl, 1907 – Somalia
Synema flavimanum Dahl, 1907 – East Africa
Synema flavipes Dahl, 1907 – Togo
Synema flavum Dahl, 1907 – East Africa
Synema flexuosum Dahl, 1907 – East Africa
Synema fuelleborni Dahl, 1907 – East Africa
Synema fuscomandibulatum Petrunkevitch, 1925 – Panama
Synema glaucothorax Piza, 1934 – Brazil
Synema globosum (Fabricius, 1775) – Palearctic
Synema globosum nigriventre (Kulczyński, 1901) – Russia (South Siberia)
Synema gracilipes Dahl, 1907 – Congo, East Africa
Synema guiyang (J. S. Zhang, Lu & Yu, 2022) – China
Synema haemorrhoidale Dahl, 1907 – Paraguay
Synema haenschi Dahl, 1907 – Guatemala, Brazil
Synema helvolum Simon, 1907 – Guinea-Bissau
Synema hildebrandti Dahl, 1907 – Madagascar
Synema hirtipes Dahl, 1907 – Zimbabwe
Synema illustre Keyserling, 1880 – Peru
Synema imitatrix (Pavesi, 1883) – Ethiopia, East, South Africa
Synema interjectivum Mello-Leitão, 1947 – Brazil
Synema jaspideum Simon, 1907 – Sierra Leone, Bioko
Synema lanceolatum Mello-Leitão, 1929 – Brazil
Synema langheldi Dahl, 1907 – East, Southern Africa
Synema laticeps Dahl, 1907 – East Africa
Synema latispinum Keyserling, 1883 – Peru
Synema latissimum Dahl, 1907 – Togo
Synema lineatum Thorell, 1894 – Singapore
Synema longipes Dahl, 1907 – Togo
Synema longispinosum Dahl, 1907 – East Africa
Synema lopezi Jiménez, 1988 – Mexico
Synema lunulatum Dahl, 1907 – Madagascar
Synema luridum Keyserling, 1880 – Peru
Synema luteovittatum Keyserling, 1891 – Brazil
Synema maculatovittatum Caporiacco, 1954 – French Guiana
Synema maculosum O. Pickard-Cambridge, 1891 – Central America
Synema madidum O. Pickard-Cambridge, 1895 – Mexico
Synema mandibulare Dahl, 1907 – East Africa
Synema marcidum Simon, 1907 – Guinea-Bissau
Synema marlothi Dahl, 1907 – South Africa
Synema multipunctatum (Simon, 1895) – Yemen, Congo, Guinea
Synema mysorense Tikader, 1980 – India
Synema nangoku Ono, 2002 – China, Japan
Synema neomexicanum Gertsch, 1939 – USA
Synema nigrianum Mello-Leitão, 1929 – Venezuela to Brazil
Synema nigriventer Dahl, 1907 – East Africa
Synema nigrotibiale Lessert, 1919 – East Africa
Synema nigrum Keyserling, 1880 – Peru
Synema nitidulum Simon, 1929 – Brazil
Synema obscurifrons Dahl, 1907 – Madagascar
Synema obscuripes Dahl, 1907 – Madagascar
Synema opulentum Simon, 1886 – Vietnam, Sumatra
Synema opulentum birmanicum Thorell, 1887 – Myanmar
Synema ornatum (Thorell, 1875) – Hungary, Russia, Ukraine
Synema palliatum O. Pickard-Cambridge, 1891 – Panama
Synema papuanellum Strand, 1913 – New Guinea
Synema paraense Mello-Leitão, 1929 – Brazil
Synema parvulum (Hentz, 1847) – USA, Mexico
Synema pauciaculeis Caporiacco, 1947 – East Africa
Synema pereirai Soares, 1943 – Brazil
Synema pichoni Schenkel, 1963 – China
Synema plorator (O. Pickard-Cambridge, 1872) – Slovakia to Israel, Iran, Central Asia
Synema pluripunctatum Mello-Leitão, 1929 – Brazil
Synema pusillum Caporiacco, 1955 – Venezuela
Synema putum O. Pickard-Cambridge, 1891 – Guatemala
Synema quadratum Mello-Leitão, 1929 – Brazil
Synema quadrifasciatum Dahl, 1907 – East Africa
Synema quadrimaculatum Roewer, 1961 – Senegal
Synema reimoseri Lessert, 1928 – Congo
Synema revolutum Tang & Li, 2010 – China, India
Synema riflense Strand, 1909 – South Africa
Synema rubromaculatum Keyserling, 1880 – Colombia, Brazil
Synema scalare Strand, 1913 – Central Africa
Synema scheffleri Dahl, 1907 – East Africa
Synema schulzi Dahl, 1907 – Brazil
Synema setiferum Mello-Leitão, 1929 – Brazil
Synema simoneae Lessert, 1919 – East Africa
Synema socium O. Pickard-Cambridge, 1891 – Panama
Synema spinosum Mello-Leitão, 1929 – Brazil
Synema spirale Dahl, 1907 – South America
Synema steckeri Dahl, 1907 – Togo, Sudan
Synema subabnorme Caporiacco, 1947 – Uganda
Synema suteri Dahl, 1907 – New Zealand
Synema tadzhikistanicum Utochkin, 1960 – Central Asia
Synema ternetzi Mello-Leitão, 1939 – Paraguay
Synema tibiale Dahl, 1907 – Malawi
Synema togoense Dahl, 1907 – Togo
Synema tricalcaratum Mello-Leitão, 1929 – Brazil
Synema trimaculosum Schmidt, 1956 – Ecuador
Synema utotchkini Marusik & Logunov, 1995 – Macedonia, Turkey, Kazakhstan, Kyrgyzstan
Synema vachoni Jézéquel, 1964 – Ivory Coast
Synema valentinieri Dahl, 1907 – Egypt
Synema vallotoni Lessert, 1923 – South Africa
Synema variabile Caporiacco, 1939 – Ethiopia
Synema viridans (Banks, 1896) – USA
Synema viridisterne Jézéquel, 1966 – Ivory Coast
Synema vittatum Keyserling, 1880 – Peru
Synema zonatum Tang & Song, 1988 – China

References

Thomisidae
Araneomorphae genera
Cosmopolitan spiders